History of Tomorrow is Taiwanese Mandopop rock band Mayday's ninth studio album, 5 years since Second Round. The first Single,"Party Animal", was released on May 20. It was released on July 21, 2016.

Promotion

Tour 

They first announced plans to tour and dates for the first round tour in Asia on their New Year's Eve concert in Taipei, Taiwan. The tour started on March 18, 2017 in Kaohsiung, Taiwan. It plans to tour in Asia, North America and Europe. More Dates such as Oceania shows will be announced soon.

Track listing

References

2016 albums
Mayday (Taiwanese band) albums